Estiva is a municipality in the state of Minas Gerais in Brazil. The population is 11,386 (2020 est.) in an area of 244 km².

References

Municipalities in Minas Gerais